Heliamphora hispida (Latin: hispidus = covered with stiff or rough hairs, bristly) is a species of Marsh Pitcher Plant endemic to Cerro Neblina, the southernmost tepui of the Guiana Highlands at the Brazil-Venezuela border.

References

  Brewer-Carías, C. (May 1973).  Defensa de la Naturaleza 2(6): 17–26.
  Brewer-Carías, C. (2012–2013).  Río Verde 9: 73–88.
 McPherson, S. (2007). Pitcher Plants of the Americas. The McDonald & Woodward Publishing Company, Blacksburg, Virginia.
 Nerz, J. (December 2004). Heliamphora elongata (Sarraceniaceae), a new species from Ilu-Tepui. Carnivorous Plant Newsletter 33(4): 111–116.
 Nerz, J. & A. Wistuba (June 2006). Heliamphora exappendiculata, a clearly distinct species with unique characteristics. Carnivorous Plant Newsletter 35(2): 43–51.
 Wistuba, A., T. Carow & P. Harbarth (September 2002). Heliamphora chimantensis, a new species of Heliamphora (Sarraceniaceae) from the ‘Macizo de Chimanta’ in the south of Venezuela. Carnivorous Plant Newsletter 31(3): 78–82.
  Wistuba, A., T. Carow, P. Harbarth, & J. Nerz (2005).  Das Taublatt 53(3): 42–50.

hispida
Flora of Venezuela
Flora of Guyana
Flora of Brazil
Plants described in 2000
Flora of the Tepuis